Dennis Hillman (born 6 April 1933) is a British weightlifter. He competed in the men's heavyweight event at the 1960 Summer Olympics.

References

1933 births
Living people
British male weightlifters
Olympic weightlifters of Great Britain
Weightlifters at the 1960 Summer Olympics
Sportspeople from Birmingham, West Midlands
20th-century British people